Faith, derived from Latin fides and Old French feid, is confidence or trust in a person, thing, or  In the context of religion, one can define faith as "belief in God or in the doctrines or teachings of religion".
According to Merriam-Webster's Dictionary, faith has multiple definitions, including "something that is believed especially with strong conviction," "complete trust," "belief and trust in and loyalty to God," as well as "a firm belief in something for which there is no proof".
   
Religious people often think of faith as confidence based on a perceived degree of warrant, or evidence.
while others who are more skeptical of religion tend to think of faith as simply belief without evidence.

Etymology 
The English word faith is thought to date from 1200 to 1250, from the Middle English feith, via Anglo-French fed, Old French feid, feit from Latin fidem, accusative of fidēs (trust), akin to fīdere (to trust).

Stages of faith development 

James W. Fowler (1940–2015) proposes a series of stages of faith-development (or spiritual development) across the human lifespan. His stages relate closely to the work of Piaget, Erikson, and Kohlberg regarding aspects of psychological development in children and adults. Fowler defines faith as an activity of trusting, committing, and relating to the world based on a set of assumptions of how one is related to others and the world.

Stages of faith 
 Intuitive-Projective: a stage of confusion and of high impressionability through stories and rituals (pre-school period).
 Mythic-Literal: a stage where provided information is accepted in order to conform with social norms (school-going period).
 Synthetic-Conventional: in this stage the faith acquired is concreted in the belief system with the forgoing of personification and replacement with authority in individuals or groups that represent one's beliefs (early late adolescence).
 Individuative-Reflective: in this stage the individual critically analyzes adopted and accepted faith with existing systems of faith. Disillusion or strengthening of faith happens in this stage. Based on needs, experiences and paradoxes (early adulthood).
 Conjunctive faith: in this stage people realize the limits of logic and, facing the paradoxes or transcendence of life, accept the "mystery of life" and often return to the sacred stories and symbols of the pre-acquired or re-adopted faith system. This stage is called negotiated settling in life (mid-life).
 Universalizing faith: this is the "enlightenment" stage where the individual comes out of all the existing systems of faith and lives life with universal principles of compassion and love and in service to others for uplift, without worries and doubt (middle-late adulthood (45–65 years old and plus).

No hard-and-fast rule requires individuals pursuing faith to go through all six stages. There is a high probability for individuals to be content and fixed in a particular stage for a lifetime; stages from 2–5 are such stages. Stage 6 is the summit of faith development. This state is often considered as "not fully" attainable.

Religious faith

Baháʼí Faith 

In the Baháʼí Faith, faith is meant, first, conscious knowledge, and second, the practice of good deeds, ultimately the acceptance of the divine authority of the Manifestations of God. In the religion's view, faith and knowledge are both required for spiritual growth. Faith involves more than outward obedience to this authority, but also must be based on a deep personal understanding of religious teachings.

Buddhism 

Faith in Buddhism refers to a serene commitment in the practice of the Buddha's teaching and trust in enlightened or highly developed beings, such as Buddhas or bodhisattvas (those aiming to become a Buddha). Buddhists usually recognize multiple objects of faith, but many are especially devoted to one particular object of faith, such as one particular Buddha.

In early Buddhism, faith was focused on the Triple Gem, that is, Gautama Buddha, his teaching (the Dhamma), and the community of spiritually developed followers, or the monastic community seeking enlightenment (the Sangha). Although offerings to the monastic community were valued highest, early Buddhism did not morally condemn peaceful offerings to deities. A faithful devotee was called upāsaka or upāsika, for which no formal declaration was required. In early Buddhism, personal verification was valued highest in attaining the truth, and sacred scriptures, reason or faith in a teacher were considered less valuable sources of authority. As important as faith was, it was a mere initial step to the path to wisdom and enlightenment, and was obsolete or redefined at the final stage of that path.

While faith in Buddhism does not imply "blind faith", Buddhist practice nevertheless requires a degree of trust, primarily in the spiritual attainment of Gautama Buddha. Faith in Buddhism centers on the understanding that the Buddha is an Awakened being, on his superior role as teacher, in the truth of his Dharma (spiritual teachings), and in his Sangha (community of spiritually developed followers). Faith in Buddhism can be summarized as faith in the Three Jewels: the Buddha, Dharma and Sangha. It is intended to lead to the goal of enlightenment, or bodhi, and Nirvana. Volitionally, faith implies a resolute and courageous act of will. It combines the steadfast resolution that one will do a thing with the self-confidence that one can do it.

In the later stratum of Buddhist history, especially Mahāyāna Buddhism, faith was given a much more important role. The concept of the Buddha Nature was developed, as devotion to Buddhas and bodhisattvas residing in Pure Lands became commonplace. With the arising of the cult of the Lotus Sūtra, faith gained a central role in Buddhist practice, which was further amplified with the development of devotion to the Amitabha Buddha in Pure Land Buddhism. In the Japanese form of Pure Land Buddhism, under the teachers Hōnen and Shinran, only entrusting faith toward the Amitabha Buddha was believed to be a fruitful form of practice, as the practice of celibacy, morality and other Buddhist disciplines were dismissed as no longer effective in this day and age, or contradicting the virtue of faith. Faith was defined as a state similar to enlightenment, with a sense of self-negation and humility.

Thus, the role of faith increased throughout Buddhist history. However, from the nineteenth century onward, Buddhist modernism in countries like Sri Lanka and Japan, and also in the West, has downplayed and criticized the role of faith in Buddhism. Faith in Buddhism still has a role in modern Asia or the West but is understood and defined differently from traditional interpretations. Within the Dalit Buddhist Movement communities, taking refuge is defined not only as a religious, but also a political choice.

Christianity 

The word translated as "faith" in English-language editions of the New Testament, the Greek word πίστις (pístis), can also be translated as "belief", "faithfulness", or "trust". Christianity encompasses various views regarding the nature of faith. Some see faith as being persuaded or convinced that something is true. In this view, a person believes something when they are presented with adequate evidence that it is true. The 13th-century theologian Saint Thomas Aquinas did not hold that faith is mere opinion: on the contrary, he held that it represents a mean (understood in the Aristotelian sense) between excessive reliance on science (i.e. demonstration) and excessive reliance on opinion.

According to Teresa Morgan, faith was understood by early Christians within the cultural milieu of the period as a relationship that created community based on trust, instead of a set of mental beliefs or feelings of the heart.   

Numerous commentators discuss the results of faith. Some believe that true faith results in good works, while others believe that while faith in Jesus brings eternal life, it does not necessarily result in good works.

Regardless of the approach taken to faith, all Christians agree that the Christian faith (in the sense of Christian practice) is aligned with the ideals and the example of the life of Jesus. The Christian contemplates the mystery of God and his grace and seeks to know and become obedient to God. To a Christian, the faith is not static, but causes one to learn more of God and to grow in faith; Christian faith has its origin in God.

In Christianity, faith causes change as it seeks a greater understanding of God. Faith is not fideism or simple obedience to a set of rules or statements. Before Christians have faith, but they must also understand in whom and in what they have faith. Without understanding, there cannot be true faith, and that understanding is built on the foundation of the community of believers, the scriptures and traditions and on the personal experiences of the believer. In English translations of the New Testament, the word "faith" generally corresponds to the Greek noun πίστις (pistis) or to the Greek verb πιστεύω (pisteuo), meaning "to trust, to have confidence, faithfulness, to be reliable, to assure".

Strength of faith 
Christians may recognize different degrees of faith when they encourage each other to and themselves strive to develop, grow, and/or deepen their faith.
This may imply that one can measure faith. Willingness to undergo martyrdom indicates a proxy for depth of faith, but does not provide an everyday measurement for the average contemporary Christian. Within the Calvinist tradition the degree of prosperity
may serve as an analog of level of faith.
Other Christian strands may rely on personal self-evaluation to measure the intensity of an individual's faith, with associated difficulties in calibrating to any scale. Solemn affirmations of a creed (a statement of faith) provide broad measurements of details. Various tribunals of the Inquisition, however, concerned themselves with precisely evaluating the orthodoxy of the faith of those it examined – in order to acquit or to punish in varying degrees.

The classification of different degrees of faith allows that faith and its expression may wax and wane in fervor - during the lifetime of a faithful individual and/or over the various historical centuries of a society with an embedded religious system. Thus, one can speak of an "Age of Faith"
or of the "decay" of a society's religiosity into corruption,
secularism,
or atheism, - interpretable as the ultimate loss of faith.

Christian apologetic views 
In contrast to Richard Dawkins' view of faith as "blind trust, in the absence of evidence, even in the teeth of evidence", Alister McGrath quotes the Oxford Anglican theologian W. H. Griffith Thomas (1861–1924), who states that faith is "not blind, but intelligent" and that it "commences with the conviction of the mind based on adequate evidence...", which McGrath sees as "a good and reliable definition, synthesizing the core elements of the characteristic Christian understanding of faith".

American biblical scholar Archibald Thomas Robertson (1863-1934) stated that the Greek word pistis used for "faith" in the New Testament (over two hundred forty times), and rendered "assurance" in Acts 17:31 (KJV), is "an old verb meaning "to furnish", used regularly by Demosthenes for bringing forward evidence." Tom Price (Oxford Centre for Christian Apologetics) affirms that when the New Testament talks about faith positively it only uses words derived from the Greek root [pistis] which means "to be persuaded".

British Christian apologist John Lennox argues that "faith conceived as belief that lacks warrant is very different from faith conceived as belief that has warrant". He states that "the use of the adjective 'blind' to describe 'faith' indicates that faith is not necessarily, or always, or indeed normally, blind". "The validity, or warrant, of faith or belief depends on the strength of the evidence on which the belief is based." "We all know how to distinguish between blind faith and evidence-based faith. We are well aware that faith is only justified if there is evidence to back it up." "Evidence-based faith is the normal concept on which we base our everyday lives."

Peter S Williams holds that "the classic Christian tradition has always valued rationality and does not hold that faith involves the complete abandonment of reason while believing in the teeth of evidence". Quoting Moreland, faith is defined as "a trust in and commitment to what we have reason to believe is true".

Regarding doubting Thomas in John 20:24–31, Williams points out that "Thomas wasn't asked to believe without evidence". He was asked to believe on the basis of the other disciples' testimony. Thomas initially lacked the first-hand experience of the evidence that had convinced them... Moreover, the reason John gives for recounting these events is that what he saw is evidence... Jesus did many other miraculous signs in the presence of his disciples...But these are written that you may believe that Jesus is the Christ, the son of God, and that believing ye might have life in his name. John 20:30,31.

Concerning doubting Thomas, Michael R. Allen wrote: "Thomas's definition of faith implies adherence to conceptual propositions for the sake of personal knowledge, knowledge of and about a person qua person".

Kenneth Boa and Robert M. Bowman Jr. describe a classic understanding of faith that is referred to as evidentialism, and which is part of a larger epistemological tradition called classical foundationalism, which is accompanied by deontologism, which holds that humans have an obligation to regulate their beliefs in accordance with evidentialist structures.

They show how this can go too far, and Alvin Plantinga deals with it. While Plantinga upholds that faith may be the result of evidence testifying to the reliability of the source (of the truth claims), yet he sees having faith as being the result of hearing the truth of the gospel with the internal persuasion by the Holy Spirit moving and enabling him to believe. "Christian belief is produced in the believer by the internal instigation of the Holy Spirit, endorsing the teachings of Scripture, which is itself divinely inspired by the Holy Spirit. The result of the work of the Holy Spirit is faith."

Catholicism 

The four-part Catechism of the Catholic Church (CCC) gives Part One to "The Profession of Faith". This section describes the content of faith. It elaborates and expands particularly upon the Apostles' Creed. CCC 144 initiates a section on the "Obedience of Faith".

In the theology of Pope John Paul II, faith is understood in personal terms as a trusting commitment of person to person and thus involves Christian commitment to the divine person of Jesus Christ.

Methodism 
In Methodism, faith plays an important role in justification, which occurs during the New Birth. The Emmanuel Association, a Methodist denomination in the conservative holiness movement, teaches:

The Church of Jesus Christ of Latter-day Saints 

The Articles of Faith of the Church of Jesus Christ of Latter-day Saints (LDS Church) states that "faith in the Lord Jesus Christ" is the first principle of the gospel.

Some alternative, yet impactful, ideas regarding the nature of faith were presented by church founder Joseph Smith in a collection of sermons, which are now published as the Lectures on Faith.

 Lecture 1 explains what faith is; 
 Lecture 2 describes how mankind comes to know about God; 
 Lectures 3 and 4 make clear the necessary and unchanging attributes of God; 
 Lecture 5 deals with the nature of God the Father, his Son Jesus Christ, and the Holy Ghost; 
 Lecture 6 proclaims that the willingness to sacrifice all earthly things is prerequisite to gaining faith unto salvation; 
 Lecture 7 treats the fruits of faith—perspective, power, and eventually perfection.

Hinduism 

Bhakti literally means "attachment, participation, fondness for, homage, faith, love, devotion, worship, purity". It was originally used in Hinduism, referring to devotion and love for a personal god or a representational god by a devotee. In ancient texts such as the Shvetashvatara Upanishad, the term simply means participation, devotion and love for any endeavor, while in the Bhagavad Gita, it connotes one of the possible paths of spirituality and towards moksha, as in bhakti marga.

Ahimsa, also referred to as nonviolence, is the fundamental tenet of Hinduism which advocates harmonious and peaceful co-existence and evolutionary growth in grace and wisdom for all humankind unconditionally.

In Hinduism, most of the Vedic prayers begins with the chants of Om. Om is the Sanskrit symbol that amazingly resonates the peacefulness ensconced within one's higher self. Om is considered to have a profound effect on the body and mind of the one who chants and also creates a calmness, serenity, healing, strength of its own to prevail within and also in the surrounding environment.

Islam 

In Islam, a believer's faith in the metaphysical aspects of Islam is called Iman, which is complete submission to the will of God, not unquestionable or blind belief. A man must build his faith on well-grounded convictions beyond any reasonable doubt and above uncertainty. According to the Quran, Iman must be accompanied by righteous deeds and the two together are necessary for entry into Paradise. In the Hadith of Gabriel, Iman in addition to Islam and Ihsan form the three dimensions of the Islamic religion.

Muhammad referred to the six axioms of faith in the Hadith of Gabriel: "Iman is that you believe in God and His Angels and His Books and His Messengers and the Hereafter and the good and evil fate [ordained by your God]." The first five are mentioned together in the Qur'an The Quran states that faith can grow with remembrance of God. The Qur'an also states that nothing in this world should be dearer to a true believer than faith.

Judaism 

Judaism recognizes the positive value of Emunah (generally translated as faith, trust in God) and the negative status of the Apikorus (heretic), but faith is not as stressed or as central as it is in other religions, especially compared with Christianity and Islam. It could be a necessary means for being a practicing religious Jew, but the emphasis is placed on true knowledge, true prophecy and practice rather than on faith itself. Very rarely does it relate to any teaching that must be believed. Judaism does not require one to explicitly identify God (a key tenet of Christian faith, which is called Avodah Zarah in Judaism, a minor form of idol worship, a big sin and strictly forbidden to Jews). Rather, in Judaism, one is to honour a (personal) idea of God, supported by the many principles quoted in the Talmud to define Judaism, mostly by what it is not. Thus there is no established formulation of Jewish principles of faith which are mandatory for all (observant) Jews.

In the Jewish scriptures, trust in God – Emunah – refers to how God acts toward his people and how they are to respond to him; it is rooted in the everlasting covenant established in the Torah, notably Deuteronomy 7:9:

The specific tenets that compose required belief and their application to the times have been disputed throughout Jewish history. Today many, but not all, Orthodox Jews have accepted Maimonides' Thirteen Principles of Belief.

A traditional example of Emunah as seen in the Jewish annals is found in the person of Abraham. On a number of occasions, Abraham both accepts statements from God that seem impossible and offers obedient actions in response to direction from God to do things that seem implausible.
"The Talmud describes how a thief also believes in G‑d: On the brink of his forced entry, as he is about to risk his life—and the life of his victim—he cries out with all sincerity, 'G‑d help me!' The thief has faith that there is a G‑d who hears his cries, yet it escapes him that this G‑d may be able to provide for him without requiring that he abrogate G‑d’s will by stealing from others. For emunah to affect him in this way he needs study and contemplation."

Sikhism 

Faith itself is not a religious concept in Sikhism. However, the five Sikh symbols, known as Kakaars or Five Ks (in Punjabi known as pañj kakkē or pañj kakār), are sometimes referred to as the Five articles of Faith. The articles include kēs (uncut hair), kaṅghā (small wooden comb), kaṛā (circular steel or iron bracelet), kirpān (sword/dagger), and kacchera (special undergarment). Baptised Sikhs are bound to wear those five articles of faith, at all times, to save them from bad company and keep them close to God.

Secular faith 

Secular faith refers to a belief or conviction that is not based on religious or supernatural doctrines.  It can arise from a variety of sources, including:

 Philosophy: Many secular beliefs are rooted in philosophical ideas, such as humanism or rationalism. These belief systems often emphasize the importance of reason, ethics, and human agency, rather than relying on supernatural or religious explanations.
 Science: Scientific discoveries and advancements can also inspire secular faith. For example, the theory of evolution has led many people to have faith in the power of natural selection and the process of evolution, rather than in a divine creator.
 Personal values and principles: People may develop secular faith based on their own personal values and principles, such as a belief in social justice or environmentalism.
 Community and culture: Secular faith can also be influenced by the values and beliefs of a particular community or culture. For example, some people may have faith in the principles of democracy, human rights, or freedom of expression.

Overall, secular faith can arise from a wide range of sources and can take many forms, depending on the individual's beliefs and experiences.

Epistemological analysis 

Epistemological study focuses on epistemic justification, the rationality of belief, and various related issues. A justified belief is a belief that is well-supported by evidence and reasons, and which is held in a rational and reasonable manner. In other words, a justified belief is one that is based on good reasons and evidence, and which is arrived at through a reliable and trustworthy process of inquiry.

 Faith is often regarded as a form of belief that may not necessarily be based on empirical evidence. However, when religious faith does make empirical claims, these claims need to undergo scientific testing in order to determine their validity
 On the other hand, some beliefs may not make empirical claims and instead focus on non-empirical issues such as ethics, morality, and spiritual practices. In these cases, it may be necessary to evaluate the validity of these beliefs based on their internal coherence and logical consistency, rather than empirical testing.

There is a wide spectrum of opinion with respect to the epistemological validity of faith - that is, whether it is a reliable way to acquire true beliefs.

Fideism 

Fideism is primarily considered to be a philosophical position rather than a comprehensive epistemological theory, which maintains that faith is independent of reason, or that reason and faith are hostile to each other and faith is superior at arriving at particular truths (see natural theology). Fideism is not a synonym for religious belief, but describes a particular philosophical proposition in regard to the relationship between faith's appropriate jurisdiction at arriving at truths, contrasted against reason. It states that faith is needed to determine some philosophical and religious truths, and it questions the ability of reason to arrive at all truth. The word and concept had its origin in the mid- to late-19th century by way of Catholic thought, in a movement called Traditionalism. The Roman Catholic Magisterium has, however, repeatedly condemned fideism.

The critiques of fideism suggest that it is not a justified or rational position from an epistemological standpoint.  Fideism holds that religious beliefs cannot be justified or evaluated on the basis of evidence or reason, and that faith alone is a sufficient basis for belief. However, this position has been criticized on the grounds that it leads to dogmatism, irrationality, and a rejection of the importance of reason and evidence in understanding the world.

According to The Cambridge Dictionary of Philosophy,  fideism can lead to irrationality and dogmatism, and argues that religious beliefs should be subject to rational inquiry and evaluation. 

William Alston argues that while faith is an important aspect of religious belief, it must be grounded in reason and evidence in order to be justified. 

Therefore, from an epistemological perspective, fideism does not appear to be a justifiable or reliable approach to knowledge and belief.

Religious epistemology 

Religious epistemologists have formulated and defended reasons for the rationality of accepting belief in God without the support of an argument. Some religious epistemologists hold that belief in God is more analogous to belief in a person than belief in a scientific hypothesis. Human relations demand trust and commitment. If belief in God is more like belief in other persons, then the trust that is appropriate to persons will be appropriate to God. American psychologist and philosopher William James offers a similar argument in his lecture The Will to Believe. Foundationalism is a view about the structure of justification or knowledge. Foundationalism holds that all knowledge and justified belief are ultimately based upon what are called properly basic beliefs. This position is intended to resolve the infinite regress problem in epistemology. According to foundationalism, a belief is epistemically justified only if it is justified by properly basic beliefs. One of the significant developments in foundationalism is the rise of reformed epistemology.

Reformed epistemology is a view about the epistemology of religious belief, which holds that belief in God can be properly basic. Analytic philosophers Alvin Plantinga and Nicholas Wolterstorff develop this view. Plantinga holds that an individual may rationally believe in God even though the individual does not possess sufficient evidence to convince an agnostic. One difference between reformed epistemology and fideism is that the former requires defence against known objections, whereas the latter might dismiss such objections as irrelevant. Plantinga has developed reformed epistemology in Warranted Christian Belief as a form of externalism that holds that the justification conferring factors for a belief may include external factors. Some theistic philosophers have defended theism by granting evidentialism but supporting theism through deductive arguments whose premises are considered justifiable. Some of these arguments are probabilistic, either in the sense of having weight but being inconclusive, or in the sense of having a mathematical probability assigned to them. Notable in this regard are the cumulative arguments presented by British philosopher Basil Mitchell and analytic philosopher Richard Swinburne, whose arguments are based on Bayesian probability. In a notable exposition of his arguments, Swinburne appeals to an inference for the best explanation.

Professor of Mathematics and philosopher of science at University of Oxford John Lennox justifies his religious belief of Jesus resurrection and miracles with believing God's capability of breaking the commonly recognized law of nature. John Lennox has stated, "Faith is not a leap in the dark; it’s the exact opposite. It’s a commitment based on evidence… It is irrational to reduce all faith to blind faith and then subject it to ridicule. That provides a very anti-intellectual and convenient way of avoiding intelligent discussion.” He criticises Richard Dawkins as a famous proponent of asserting that faith equates to holding a belief without evidence, thus that it is possible to hold belief without evidence, for failing to provide evidence for this assertion.

Critics of reformed epistemology argue that it fails to provide a compelling justification for belief in God, and that it is unable to account for the diversity of religious belief and experience. They also argue that it can lead to a kind of epistemic relativism, in which all religious beliefs are considered equally valid and justified, regardless of their content or coherence. Despite these criticisms, reformed epistemology has been influential in contemporary philosophy of religion and continues to be an active area of debate and discussion.

Empirical claims 
There is a possibility that a religious belief can be contradicted by science. This is because religious beliefs are often based on faith, tradition, and revelation, whereas science is based on empirical evidence, reason, and observation. Therefore, when scientific findings are in conflict with religious beliefs, it can create a tension between the two. 

Richard Dawkins argues in "The God Delusion" that the idea of God should be treated as a scientific hypothesis about the universe and subjected to the same level of scrutiny and analysis as any other scientific hypothesis. He maintains that the existence of God is an empirical question that can be investigated and evaluated using evidence and reason.

It is not always clear whether religious beliefs make empirical claims or not, as religious texts and traditions often contain both empirical and non-empirical elements. However, when a religious belief does make empirical claims, these claims can be subject to empirical testing to determine their validity.

For example, the claim that prayer can cure physical illnesses is an empirical claim that can be tested through scientific studies. If studies consistently show that prayer has no effect on physical healing, then this would call into question the validity of that particular religious belief.

On the other hand, some religious beliefs may not make empirical claims and instead may be concerned with non-empirical matters such as ethics, morality, and spiritual practices. In these cases, the validity of these beliefs may need to be evaluated based on their internal coherence and logical consistency rather than empirical testing.  

While it is true that many religious beliefs are intended to be metaphorical or symbolic, there are also religious beliefs that are taken quite literally by believers. For example, some Christians believe that the Earth was created in six literal days, and some Muslims believe that the Quran contains scientific facts that were not known to humans at the time of its revelation. Furthermore, even if a religious belief is intended to be metaphorical or symbolic, it can still be subject to empirical testing if it makes claims about the world. For example, the claim that the Earth is the center of the universe can be interpreted as a metaphorical representation of humanity's special place in the cosmos, but it also makes an empirical claim that can be tested by scientific observation.
 

Although many theologians say they no longer accept the literal Bible, there are still many who still accept the literal Bible, including the story of Noah. According to Gallup, about 50 percent of American voters still take Bible verses literally.  If you take the good book to its literal extreme and some people can justify murder in 1994 that the Reverend Paul Jennings Hill shot and killed Dr. John Britton. Hill went to his death claiming his actions were backed by Holy Scripture.(also see Anti-abortion violence)

Morality & Faith 
From a scientific perspective, morality is not dependent on faith. While some individuals may claim that their morality is rooted in their faith or religious beliefs, there is evidence to suggest that morality is also influenced by other factors, such as social and cultural norms, empathy, and reason. Studies have shown that individuals from diverse cultural and religious backgrounds tend to share many moral values, suggesting that morality is not solely dependent on faith. Additionally, research in the fields of psychology, neuroscience, and evolutionary biology has shed light on the biological and cognitive mechanisms underlying moral decision-making, providing further evidence that morality is not exclusively dependent on faith.

Criticism 

Bertrand Russell wrote:

Evolutionary biologist Richard Dawkins criticizes all faith by generalizing from specific faith in propositions that conflict directly with scientific evidence. He describes faith as belief without evidence; a process of active non-thinking. He states that it is a practice that only degrades our understanding of the natural world by allowing anyone to make a claim about nature that is based solely on their personal thoughts, and possibly distorted perceptions, that does not require testing against nature, has no ability to make reliable and consistent predictions, and is not subject to peer review.

A significant number of people in the United States and other countries reject established scientific results, including the fact that the emission of greenhouse gases causes global warming. This rejection of scientific findings is primarily due to motivated cognition, where individuals tend to reject information that contradicts their fundamental beliefs or worldview.

Philosophy professor Peter Boghossian argues that reason and evidence are the only way to determine which "claims about the world are likely true". Different religious traditions make different religious claims, and Boghossian asserts that faith alone cannot resolve conflicts between these without evidence. He gives as an example of the belief held by that Muslims that Muhammad (who died in the year 632) was the last prophet, and the contradictory belief held by Mormons that Joseph Smith (born in 1805) was a prophet. Boghossian asserts that faith has no "built-in corrective mechanism". For factual claims, he gives the example of the belief that the Earth is 4,000 years old. With only faith and no reason or evidence, he argues, there is no way to correct this claim if it is inaccurate. Boghossian advocates thinking of faith either as "belief without evidence" or "pretending to know things you don't know".

Friedrich Nietzsche expressed his criticism of the Christian idea of faith in passage 51 of The Antichrist: The fact that faith, under certain circumstances, may work for blessedness, but that this blessedness produced by an idée fixe by no means makes the idea itself true, and the fact that faith actually moves no mountains, but instead raises them up where there were none before: all this is made sufficiently clear by a walk through a lunatic asylum. Not, of course, to a priest: for his instincts prompt him to the lie that sickness  is not sickness and lunatic asylums not lunatic asylums. Christianity finds sickness necessary, just as the Greek spirit had need of a superabundance of health—the actual ulterior purpose of the whole system of salvation of the church is to make people ill. And the church itself—doesn’t it set up a Catholic lunatic asylum as the ultimate ideal?—The whole earth as a madhouse?—The sort of religious man that the church wants is a typical décadent; the moment at which a religious crisis dominates a people is always marked by epidemics of nervous disorder; the “inner world” of the religious man is so much like the “inner world” of the overstrung and exhausted that it is difficult to distinguish between them; the “highest” states of mind, held up before mankind by Christianity as of supreme worth, are actually epileptoid in form—the church has granted the name of holy only to lunatics or to gigantic frauds in majorem dei honorem....

Gustave Le Bon emphasizes the irrational nature of faith and suggests that it is often based on emotions rather than reason. He argues that faith can be used to manipulate and control people, particularly in the context of religious or political movements. In this sense, Le Bon views faith as a tool that can be wielded by those in power to shape the beliefs and behaviors of the masses.

See also

References

Sources

Further reading 
  Gupta, Nijay K. (2020-02-04). Paul and the Language of Faith. Wm. B. Eerdmans Publishing. ISBN 978-1-4674-5837-5
 Morgan, Teresa Jean (2015). Roman Faith and Christian Faith: Pistis and Fides in the Early Roman Empire and Early Churches. Oxford University Press. ISBN 978-0-19-872414-8.
 Sam Harris, The End of Faith: Religion, Terror, and the Future of Reason, W. W. Norton (2004), hardcover, 336 pages, 
 Stephen Palmquist, "Faith as Kant's Key to the Justification of Transcendental Reflection", The Heythrop Journal 25:4 (October 1984), pp. 442–455. Reprinted as Chapter V in Stephen Palmquist, Kant's System of Perspectives (Lanham: University Press of America, 1993).
 D. Mark Parks, "Faith/Faithfulness" Holman Illustrated Bible Dictionary. Eds. Chad Brand, Charles Draper, Archie England. Nashville: Holman Publishers, 2003.
 On Faith and Reason by Swami Tripurari
 Baba, Meher: Discourses, San Francisco: Sufism Reoriented, 1967.
 Richard Dawkins‘ God Delusion (online reading)

Classic reflections on the nature of faith 
 Martin Buber, I and Thou
 Paul Tillich, The Dynamics of Faith

The Reformation view of faith 
 John Calvin, The Institutes of the Christian Religion, 1536
 R.C. Sproul, Faith Alone, Baker Books, 1 February 1999,

The Catholic view of faith

External links 

 
 
 
 Faith in Judaism chabad.org
 Pew Research Center Reports on Religion
   We'd be better off without religion? Panellists: Christopher Hitchens,  Nigel Spivey,  Richard Dawkins, rabbi Juliet Neuberger, AC Grayling and Roger Scruton.
 The God Delusion Debate (Dawkins – Lennox) （Dawkins believes the law of nature and denies Jesus resurrection and miracles;  Lennox believes Jesus resurrection and miracles with justification by God's capability of breaking the commonly recognized law of nature.)
 Dialogue with Professor Richard Dawkins, Archbishop of Canterbury Rowan Williams and Professor Anthony Kenny （four topics: the nature of individual human beings, the origin of the human species, thirdly the origin of life on Earth, and finally the origin of the universe)

 
Belief
Religious belief and doctrine
Seven virtues